Jean Alt (8 August 1921 – 22 July 1991) was a French scientist and meteorologist. He was born in Paris.

International Geophysical Year (57-58) 

Alt was a scientist of the IGY. He took part in the American mission Deep Freeze III in Little America V (an Antarctica base) during the winter of 1958. He stayed 16 months in Antarctica.

He was part of the little America V team in the same period that Albert P. Crary

Later the Advisory Committee on Antarctic Names gave his name to a glacier: the Alt Glacier

Bibliography

References 

1921 births
1991 deaths
French Antarctic scientists
Scientists from Paris
French meteorologists
Météo-France staff